Roger Apéry (14 November 1916, Rouen – 18 December 1994, Caen) was a French mathematician most remembered for Apéry's theorem, which states that  is an irrational number. Here,  denotes the Riemann zeta function.

Biography
Apéry was born in Rouen in 1916 to a French mother and Greek father. His childhood was spent in Lille until 1926, when the family moved to Paris, where he studied at the Lycée Ledru-Rollin and the Lycée Louis-le-Grand.  He was admitted  at the École normale supérieure in 1935.  His studies were interrupted at the start of World War II; he was mobilized in September 1939, taken prisoner of war in June 1940, repatriated with pleurisy in June 1941, and hospitalized until August 1941. He wrote his doctoral thesis in algebraic geometry under the direction of Paul Dubreil and René Garnier in 1947.

In 1947 Apéry was appointed Maître de conférences (lecturer) at the University of Rennes. In 1949 he was appointed Professor at the University of Caen, where he remained until his retirement.

An indication of the difficulty is that the corresponding problem for other odd powers remains unsolved. Nevertheless, many mathematicians have since worked on the so-called Apéry sequences to seek alternative proofs that might apply to other odd powers (Frits Beukers, Alfred van der Poorten, Marc Prévost, Keith Ball, Tanguy Rivoal, Wadim Zudilin, and others).

Apéry was active in politics and for a few years in the 1960s was president of the Calvados Radical Party of the Left. He abandoned politics after the reforms instituted by Edgar Faure after the 1968 revolt, when he realised that university life was running against the tradition he had always upheld.

Personal life 
Apéry married in 1947 and had three sons, including mathematician François Apéry. His first marriage ended in divorce in 1971. He then remarried in 1972 and divorced in 1977.

In 1994, Apéry died from Parkinson's disease after a long illness in Caen. He was buried next to his parents at the Père Lachaise Cemetery in Paris. His tombstone has a mathematical inscription stating his theorem.

See also
 Apéry's constant
 Basel problem

External links

1916 births
1994 deaths
École Normale Supérieure alumni
Scientists from Rouen
Academic staff of the University of Caen Normandy
Number theorists
French people of Greek descent
20th-century French mathematicians
French prisoners of war in World War II
Academic staff of the University of Rennes
Lycée Louis-le-Grand alumni
Neurological disease deaths in France
Deaths from Parkinson's disease
Burials at Père Lachaise Cemetery
French military personnel of World War II